Sillian is a market town in the district of Lienz, in the Austrian state of Tyrol.

Geography
The settlement is situated north of the upper Drava river, on the sunny slopes of the Villgraten Mountains. In the south, the valley stretches to the Lienz Dolomites and the Carnic Alps.

Climate
The weather in Sillian is extremely changeable due to its location, and it can quickly change from warm and balmy to sub-zero.

History
The area belonged to the estates granted by Duke Tassilo III of Bavaria to Innichen Abbey in 769. First mentioned about 1000, the estates of Silano were held by the Meinhardiner counts of Gorizia from the 13th century onwards. The parish church was consecrated in 1326. Count Leonhard of Gorizia vested the citizens with market privileges in 1469. Upon the extinction of the line in 1500, Sillian was seized by the House of Habsburg king Maximilian I and incorporated into the County of Tyrol.

Up to World War I, Sillian was a garrison town of the Austro-Hungarian Army. By the 1919 Treaty of Saint Germain, it became a border town close to the South Tyrolean lands of the Italian kingdom.

Population

Notable people
Young Richard Strauss from 1872 onwards spent several summers at Sillian; he is purported to have played the church organ as well as the hotel piano of the Schwarzer Adler (Black Eagle) inn, and even to have composed here.

Economy
Sillian's economy mainly relies on wood processing and tourism. There are 1200 guest beds of all categories available.

References

External links

Cities and towns in Lienz District